Michael Matthew Bowden (born September 9, 1986) is an American professional baseball pitcher who is a free agent. He previously played in Major League Baseball (MLB) with the Boston Red Sox and Chicago Cubs, in Nippon Professional Baseball (NPB) with the Saitama Seibu Lions, and in the KBO League (KBO) with the Doosan Bears. He attended high school at Waubonsie Valley High School in Aurora, Illinois. He was selected by the Boston Red Sox in the 1st round of the 2005 Major League Baseball Draft.

Career

Boston Red Sox

Bowden began the  season with the Sea Dogs and was promoted to the Pawtucket Red Sox, the Triple-A affiliate of the Boston Red Sox, on July 18, 2008. On August 30, Bowden made his first major league start against the Chicago White Sox. He received the decision in a five-inning start, giving up seven hits and two runs in an 8–2 win. On April 26, Bowden was called up to bolster the bullpen after a night where the Red Sox bullpen got overworked.  He later worked two perfect innings against the New York Yankees.

Bowden was recalled July 18, 2010 after spending the beginning of the season in Pawtucket. After three relief appearances, he was optioned back five days later to make room for Josh Beckett, who was coming off the disabled list. On August 14, 2010, Bowden was once again recalled, and then optioned back on August 28 to make room for Hideki Okajima.

In , Bowden began the season with Pawtucket, for whom he pitched in 14 games with a 1.59 ERA. He was recalled to the Red Sox on May 17 when Daisuke Matsuzaka was placed on the 15-day disabled list with an elbow injury. Bowden was recalled on August 27, to replace Scott Atchison. On April 15, 2012, Bowden was designated for assignment.

Chicago Cubs
On April 21, 2012, Bowden was traded to the Chicago Cubs along with a player to be named later for Marlon Byrd. On April 14, 2013, Bowden, along with Edwin Jackson, broke the record for most wild pitches in an inning, with 5. He was designated for assignment on May 21, 2013. He returned to the Cubs when his contract was selected on July 11, 2013. He was designated for assignment again on September 4, 2013, and became a free agent on October 1.

Saitama Seibu Lions
Bowden signed a contract with the Seibu Lions of Nippon Professional Baseball for the 2014 season. He developed a split-finger fastball while playing for the Seibu Lions.

Cincinnati Reds
On December 24, 2014, Bowden signed a minor league deal with the Cincinnati Reds. On December 29, 2014, he was assigned to AAA Louisville Bats.

Baltimore Orioles
On April 4, 2015, Bowden was traded to the Baltimore Orioles in exchange for cash considerations. He was immediately assigned to the Triple-A Norfolk Tides.

Minnesota Twins
Bowden signed a minor league deal with the Minnesota Twins on July 25, 2015. He elected free agency on November 6.

Doosan Bears
Bowden signed a one-year contract worth $650,000 with the Doosan Bears in the Korea Baseball Organization in November 2015. On June 30, 2016, Bowden pitched a complete game no-hitter against the NC Dinos. On December 12, 2016, Bowden re-signed his contract worth $1.1 mil with the Bears for the 2017 season. On November 25, 2017, Bowden announced that he would not be returning to the Bears for the 2018 season.

Los Angeles Dodgers
On March 4, 2019, Bowden signed a minor league contract with the Los Angeles Dodgers. He made one start for the AAA Oklahoma City Dodgers and four starts for the AA Tulsa Drillers, with a 6.97 ERA before he was released on June 3.

Pericos de Puebla
On June 29, 2019, Bowden signed with the Pericos de Puebla of the Mexican League. He was released on July 3, 2019.

High Point Rockers
On July 13, 2019, Bowden signed with the High Point Rockers of the Atlantic League of Professional Baseball. He was released on September 11, 2019.

Chicago Dogs
On March 4, 2021, Bowden signed with the Chicago Dogs of the American Association of Professional Baseball. In 2021, Bowden recorded a 7–1 record and 2.92 ERA in 12 appearances with the Dogs. On June 16, 2022, Bowden was released by the Dogs.

References

External links

1986 births
Living people
Águilas Cibaeñas players
American expatriate baseball players in the Dominican Republic
American expatriate baseball players in Japan
American expatriate baseball players in Mexico
American expatriate baseball players in South Korea
American people of English descent
Baseball players from Illinois
Boston Red Sox players
Chicago Cubs players
Chicago Dogs players
Doosan Bears players
Greenville Drive players
Gulf Coast Red Sox players
High Point Rockers players
Iowa Cubs players
KBO League pitchers
Lancaster JetHawks players
Major League Baseball pitchers
Mexican League baseball pitchers
Navegantes del Magallanes players
American expatriate baseball players in Venezuela
Nippon Professional Baseball pitchers
Norfolk Tides players
Pawtucket Red Sox players
Pericos de Puebla players
Oklahoma City Dodgers players
People from Winfield, Illinois
Portland Sea Dogs players
Saitama Seibu Lions players
Sportspeople from Aurora, Illinois
Tulsa Drillers players
Wilmington Blue Rocks players